The Battle of Mamaroneck (also known as the Skirmish of Heathcote Hill) was a skirmish in the New York and New Jersey campaign of the American Revolutionary War fought on October 22, 1776, at Mamaroneck, Westchester County, New York. Following the retreat of George Washington's army to White Plains, British General William Howe landed troops in Westchester County, intending to cut off Washington's escape route. To cover the eastern flank of his army, Howe ordered Major Robert Rogers and his Rangers to seize the village of Mamaroneck which had been recently abandoned by the Continental army. On the night of October 22, 750 men under Colonel John Haslet attacked the British encampment. Haslet's men achieved complete surprise, but Rogers' Rangers rallied and drove off the attackers.

References

Mamaroneck, New York
1776 in New York (state)
Conflicts in 1776
Mamaroneck